is a 2019 kart racing mobile game and the ninth mainline entry in the Mario Kart series, developed by Nintendo EPD and published by Nintendo for iOS and Android devices. The game was announced in January 2018 and was released on September 25, 2019, on Apple App Store and Google Play.

This game features biweekly, downloadable themed tours with different cups, each of which has three courses and a bonus challenge. In addition to courses which already appeared in the Mario Kart series, Mario Kart Tour includes courses located in world cities (New York, Tokyo, Paris, London, Vancouver, Los Angeles, Berlin, Sydney, Singapore, Amsterdam, and Bangkok).

Gameplay

The game deviates from the traditional gameplay of the Mario Kart series, where the objective is to reach the finish line in first; this game utilizes a point-based system. There are four options of speed: 50cc (namely "leisurely"), 100cc ("fast"), 150cc ("very fast") and 200cc ("too fast"; Gold Pass only that is subscription in the game). Unlike previous installments in the series, much of the driving (notably acceleration, jump boosts) is performed automatically. Mario Kart Tour includes features from previous Mario Kart games, such as underwater racing and hang gliding from Mario Kart 7. This game introduces a new Frenzy mode, which occurs when a driver gets three identical items from an item box, allowing them to repeatedly use the item for a short period. Each character can get a unique item (also known as "Special Skill") from item boxes.

Mario Kart Tour introduces a new format called "Tours". Tours are named after cities in the real world, Mario series characters, Mario series games, or other themes. Each tour lasts for two weeks, beginning on Wednesday at 1.00 a.m. EST. In a tour, players can compete in twelve to eighteen cups and collect drivers, karts and gliders which represent the corresponding cities or themes. There are also spotlight drivers, karts, and gliders while a tour lasts for two weeks. Each Cup consists of three courses (some courses that are based on the ones from Super Mario Kart are labelled as "remix courses" (abbreviated to "RMX courses") and use a different layout compared to the original, and feature new mechanics) and a bonus challenge. Courses from previous cups may be reused for subsequent cups. Most races have two laps, while most bonus challenges are done in one lap. The cups are also named after some of the drivers in the game instead of the usual items in the Mario franchise, similar to the Mario Kart Arcade GP series.

After the player finishes a race, the player is awarded Grand Stars to unlock tour gifts, coins and experience points for the used character, kart, and glider. If the player finishes in the top three, they will earn some player points for their level. If the player finishes in 5th place or below, the level-gauge will decrease. When the player fills the gauge all the way, they will level-up to get a reward. Each course also has an experience point limit. Currently, the max player-level is 300.

Each week, a tour's cup is a tournament. 20 players are placed on a leaderboard based on the overall score for the cup. By the following Wednesday, Lakitu announces how well the player did. The player will increase in tier, and earn some rewards if their end position is near the top, but they will lose one or two tiers if they finish poorly. The player also gets a reward if the player and their friends' score reaches a certain amount.

This game includes races against AI-controlled opponents with usernames of real players. In addition, a beta test for the multiplayer function of this game began from "approximately 2:00 p.m. EST on December 19, 2019 to 12:59 p.m. EST on December 27, 2019" and was only available for subscribers to the Gold Pass. From January 23, 2020, to January 29, 2020, there was a multiplayer test for all players of the game.

At 11:00 p.m. EST on March 8, 2020, multiplayer function in Mario Kart Tour was officially launched. All players "can race against up to seven other players, whether they're registered as in-game friends, nearby to your location, or even scattered around the world." In the meantime, "Gold Races are available exclusively to subscribers of the Mario Kart Tour Gold Pass." One of the main differences between the Standard Races (for players without the Gold Pass) and the Gold Races is the selection of speed: only 100cc is available in the Standard Races while 150cc and 200cc are available in the Gold Races. There is a multiplayer rank (ranging from F to A, S to S+6 if subscribed to the Gold Pass) for each player. A percentage for the rank will increase when a player wins in a multiplayer race, but will decrease or remain unchanged during a loss.

The game originally could only be played in portrait mode; however, on July 21, 2020, the game received an update that allowed the players to also play the game in landscape mode. An update in March 2022 added support for Miis as playable racers.

On February 9, 2022, Nintendo announced that several of the game's original tracks will be bundled as DLC tracks for the previously released Mario Kart 8 Deluxe for the Nintendo Switch.

On September 2, 2022, Nintendo announced that the game's most controversial piece, the "gacha" mechanic with the ruby spotlight pipe would be removed and replaced with a normal shop that would not only include any new tours' brand new characters, gliders, and karts; but bring back old ones that players missed out on in previous tours. Alongside that was the reveal of battle mode making its return. Both were done with an update released October 5, 2022.

Development

In January 2018, Nintendo announced a mobile version of the Mario Kart series for iOS and Android. Nintendo announced in April 2019 that they would be holding a closed beta for the game, exclusively for Android users, which took place from late May to early June. Initially expected to be released by March 2019, the game was released on September 25, 2019. As of September 26, a day after Mario Kart Tour release, there had been over ten million downloads of the game.

To celebrate the Super Mario Bros. 35th Anniversary, the game was updated to include two new characters: SNES Mario and Donkey Kong Jr., who had not appeared in the series since Super Mario Kart.

Reception 

On its first day, Mario Kart Tour was available for download in 58 markets, including the Japanese and American markets. Revenue-wise, it placed #19 for iPhone apps in the United States. This was a significant debut improvement compared to Dr. Mario World, a match-three mobile game also developed by Nintendo and released on July 9, 2019, which placed #503 during its debut. Another game published by Nintendo on February 2, 2019, Fire Emblem Heroes, placed #17 on the top iPhone revenue app during its debut.

Mario Kart Tour received 90.1 million downloads in its first week of availability according to Sensor Tower, the highest number of first-week downloads for a Nintendo mobile game, surpassing Animal Crossing: Pocket Camps 14.3 million downloads. It also made $12.7 million in first-week player spending, the 3rd-highest for a Nintendo mobile game behind Fire Emblem Heroes ($28.2 million) and Super Mario Run ($16.1 million). Total downloads reached 123.9 million in the first month of release, generating $37.4 million in player spending. In April 2021, Sensortower released an information about Mario Kart Tour surpassing 200 million downloads and 200 million for revenue, making it the second biggest mobile game in revenue for Nintendo, only behind Fire Emblem Heroes.

The game received "mixed or average reviews" according to review aggregator Metacritic. While critics praised the graphics and simple controls, they criticized Mario Kart Tours gacha element, as well as its monthly $4.99 Gold Pass feature, which is required to use the game's 200cc feature, to get more items and in-game achievements, the constant need for a stable internet connection, and the only way to unlock things like karts and gold badges in the game requires money. Many journalists noted that the monthly charge for the subscription service was the same as that of Apple Arcade, which launched a few days prior to the release of Mario Kart Tour, claiming that the former provides subscribers with more content for the same price and thus, is a better value. The game was also criticized for player selection multiplayer functionality and not having characters at launch like Luigi who had been available in trailers, tutorials and the beta testing stage of the game.

Accolades
The game won the award for "Racing Game of the Year" at the 23rd Annual D.I.C.E. Awards, and was nominated for "Favorite Video Game" at the 2020 Kids' Choice Awards.

Notes

References

External links

 

2019 video games
Android (operating system) games
Dinosaurs in video games
Free-to-play video games
iOS games
Tour
Mario racing games
Multiplayer and single-player video games
Nintendo Entertainment Planning & Development games
Video games developed in Japan
Video games set in Amsterdam
Video games set in Athens
Video games set in Bangkok
Video games set in Berlin
Video games set in London
Video games set in Los Angeles
Video games set in New York City
Video games set in Paris
Video games set in Singapore
Video games set in Sydney
Video games set in Tokyo
Video games set in Vancouver
Interactive Achievement Award winners